Bemidji Township is a township in Beltrami County, Minnesota, United States. The population was 3,134 as of the 2010 census.

Geography

The southern three-quarters of the city of Bemidji is within this township geographically but is a separate entity.

Unincorporated towns
 Norway Park at 
 Rosby at 
(This list is based on USGS data and may include former settlements.)

Major highways
  U.S. Route 2
  U.S. Route 71
  Minnesota State Highway 197

Lakes
 Carr Lake
 Lake Bemidji (south quarter)
 Lake Irving (east edge)
 Lake Marquette
 Lake Plantagenet

Adjacent townships
 Northern Township (north)
 Frohn Township (east)
 Farden Township, Hubbard County (southeast)
 Helga Township, Hubbard County (south)
 Rockwood Township, Hubbard County (southwest)
 Grant Valley Township (west)

Cemeteries
The township contains these four cemeteries: Calvary, Greenwood, Holy Cross and Nymore.

Demographics
As of the census of 2000, there were 2,934 people, 1,012 households, and 754 families residing in the township. The racial makeup of the township was 89.37% White, 0.20% African American, 6.82% Native American, 0.41% Asian, 0.55% from other races, and 2.66% from two or more races. Hispanic or Latino of any race were 0.85% of the population.

There were 1,012 households, out of which 38.6% had children under the age of 18 living with them, 61.4% were married couples living together, 9.0% had a female householder with no husband present, and 25.4% were non-families. 18.1% of all households were made up of individuals, and 4.5% had someone living alone who was 65 years of age or older.  The average household size was 2.80 and the average family size was 3.16.

In the township the population was spread out, with 28.8% under the age of 18, 13.6% from 18 to 24, 27.1% from 25 to 44, 21.9% from 45 to 64, and 8.6% who were 65 years of age or older.  The median age was 32 years. For every 100 females, there were 102.9 males.  For every 100 females age 18 and over, there were 100.2 males.

The median income for a household in the township was $41,279, and the median income for a family was $46,116. Males had a median income of $35,938 versus $22,973 for females. The per capita income for the township was $18,218.  About 6.9% of families and 10.5% of the population were below the poverty line, including 9.6% of those under age 18 and 14.4% of those age 65 or over.

References
 United States National Atlas
 United States Census Bureau 2007 TIGER/Line Shapefiles
 United States Board on Geographic Names (GNIS)

External links
Bemidji Township official website

Townships in Beltrami County, Minnesota
Townships in Minnesota